is a Japanese voice actor from Gunma Prefecture, Japan. He is affiliated with Ken Production.

Filmography

Anime
 Assassination Classroom (Takuya Muramatsu)
 Blue Drop (Kanseikan)
 Brave Witches (Kōhei Karibuchi)
 Dies Irae (Rot Spinne)
 Fantastic Children (Hemas)
 Hamatora: The Animation (Sōichi Nashidaira)
 Hikarian: Great Railroad Protector (E2 Jet)
 Hungry Heart: Wild Striker (Yūjirō Kamiyama)
 Kaze no Stigma (Lai)
 Magikano (Hajime Hario)
 Mars Daybreak (Bronson)
 Melody of Oblivion (Kuron)
 My Bride Is a Mermaid (Maguro)
 Papuwa (Doctor Takamatsu)
 Petopeto-san (Ryūta Katō)
 RahXephon (Yōhei Yomoda)
 Samurai Deeper Kyo (Bikara, Maki)
 Slap-up Party: Arad Senki (Bikan)
 Space Battleship Yamato 2199 (Shinpei Iwata)

Original video animation
 Canary (Yasuo Shinjō, Yūji Yahagi)
 Hunter x Hunter: Greed Island (Binolt)
 Street Fighter Alpha (Rolento Schugerg)

Theatrical animation
 RahXephon: Pluralitas Concentio (Yōhei Yomoda)
 Space Battleship Yamato 2199: Odyssey of the Celestial Ark (Shinpei Iwata)

Video games
 Canary (Yasuo Shinjō, Yūji Yahagi)
 Dies irae ~Amantes amentes~ (Rot Spinne)
 The Legend of Zelda: Spirit Tracks (Chancellor Cole)
 Luminous Arc 2 (Moose)
 Routes (Eddie)
 Suikoden IV (Bartholomew, Gau)

Dubbing
 The 51st State (Iki)
 Black Hawk Down (PVT John Waddell)

References

External links
 Ken Production profile
 

Living people
1971 births
Japanese male video game actors
Japanese male voice actors
Male voice actors from Gunma Prefecture
20th-century Japanese male actors
21st-century Japanese male actors
Ken Production voice actors